Harold Bratt  (8 October 1939 – 8 October 2018) was an English footballer. His regular position was at full back. He was born in Salford, Lancashire. He played for Manchester United and Doncaster Rovers.

External links
MUFCInfo.com profile

1939 births
English footballers
Manchester United F.C. players
Doncaster Rovers F.C. players
Living people
Association football fullbacks